Amit Majmudar (born 1979) is an American novelist and poet. In 2015, he was named the first Poet Laureate of Ohio.

Life
Majmudar, a son of Indian immigrants, grew up in the Cleveland area. He earned a BS at the University of Akron and an MD at Northeast Ohio Medical University. He is a diagnostic radiologist specializing in nuclear medicine practicing full-time in Columbus, Ohio, where he lives with his wife Ami and his twin sons, Shiv and Savya, and daughter Aishani. One of the twins has a congenital heart defect.

His poems have appeared in The Antioch Review, Image, Poetry, Poetry Northwest, National Poetry Review, The New England Review, Smartish Pace, River Styx, and The New Yorker.

Bibliography

Novels

Sitayana. 2019.

 Partitions. 2011.

Short fiction 
"Secret Lives of the Detainees", The Kenyon Review, 2016; selected for The O. Henry Prize Stories 2017 (Anchor Books), edited by Laura Furman; noted as favorite in book by juror Elizabeth McCracken.

Poetry 
Collections
 
 
 
 Dothead
List of poems

"By Accident", Counter Balance
"The Miscarriage", Poetry, June 2008
"Instructions to an Artisan", Poetry, June 2008
"Reading", The Formalist
"To The Hyphenated Poets", Poetry, September 2012
 

Translations
 Godsong : a verse translation of the Bhagavad Gita
Anthologies
Resistance, rebellion, life : 50 poems now / edited and introduced by Amit Majmudar

Notes

Further reading
 "Book Review: 'Partitions'". NPR.
 "Review: Poetry by Lucia Perillo and Amit Majmudar". The New York Times.
"Amit Majmudar's 'The Abundance' trades fake family happiness for something real". The Plain Dealer.
"Four lives displaced by the dividing of India; Books and Authors". The Seattle Times. 
"A New Wave". The Virginian-Pilot. 
"3 books about restless Indians". The Washington Post. 
"Amit Majmudar puts the 1947 'Partitions' on a human scale: New in Paperback". The Plain Dealer.
"Indian American Novelist Amit Majmudar Named Ohio’s First Poet Laureate". India West.
"Ohio’s first official poet says writing isn’t work". The Columbus Dispatch.
"To Take Out Trump, Hillary Clinton Must First Dispense With Her Inner Politician". Time.

External links
Amit Majmudar at the Poetry Foundation
Amit Majmudar at Penguin India

1979 births
Living people
20th-century American poets
20th-century American male writers
21st-century American novelists
21st-century American poets
21st-century American male writers
American male poets
American male writers of Indian descent
American radiologists
Novelists from Ohio
People from Columbus, Ohio
Physicians from Ohio
Poets Laureate of Ohio
The New Yorker people
University of Akron alumni
Writers from Cleveland
Northeast Ohio Medical University alumni
O. Henry Award winners